Live from Under the Brooklyn Bridge is a digital EP by the Irish rock band U2, released exclusively through the iTunes Store in the United States and Canada on 8 December 2004. The four tracks have only been released digitally as AAC .m4p files. As of 12 May 2009, this EP is no longer available from the iTunes store.

All the tracks were recorded live on 22 November 2004, at a "surprise" concert held in Brooklyn, New York under the Brooklyn Bridge at Empire-Fulton Ferry State Park. The concert was performed after a full day of filming the music video for "All Because of You" in New York City. The concert itself was filmed for an MTV special.

Track listing

Personnel
Bono – lead vocals, guitar (on "She's a Mystery to Me")
The Edge – guitar, keyboards, vocals
Adam Clayton – bass guitar
Larry Mullen Jr. – drums

Entire concert setlist
This is a listing of all the tracks played at the Brooklyn Bridge concert on 22 November 2004.  Only noted tracks have been officially released.

"Vertigo"
"All Because of You" – released on digital EP
"Miracle Drug"
"Sometimes You Can't Make It on Your Own" – released on digital EP
"City of Blinding Lights" – released as a digital single on iTunes in Europe and Australia
"Original of the Species"
"She's a Mystery to Me" – released on "All Because of You" single in Europe, Australia, and Japan.
"Beautiful Day"
Encore
"Out of Control" – released on "City of Blinding Lights" single in Germany
"I Will Follow" – released on digital EP
"Vertigo" (reprise) – released on digital EP

See also
U2 discography

External links
Live from Under the Brooklyn Bridge at U2 Wanderer, with comprehensive details on various editions, cover scans, lyrics, and more

ITunes-exclusive releases
Live EPs
2004 EPs
U2 EPs
U2 live albums
2004 live albums
Brooklyn Bridge